The coat of arms of Pennsylvania is an official emblem of the Commonwealth of Pennsylvania, alongside the seal and state flag, and was adopted in 1778.

Design and symbolism 
The Pennsylvania coat of arms features a shield crested by a North American bald eagle, flanked by horses, and adorned with symbols of Pennsylvania's strengths—a ship carrying state commerce to all parts of the world; a clay-red plough, a symbol of Pennsylvania's rich natural resources; and three golden sheaves of wheat, representing fertile fields and Pennsylvania's wealth of human thought and action. An olive branch and cornstalk cross limbs beneath—symbols of peace and prosperity. The state motto, "Virtue, Liberty and Independence", appears festooned below. Atop the coat of arms is a bald eagle, representing Pennsylvania's loyalty to the United States.

Use 
Besides being used by itself, the coat of arms is used on the state flag, many governmental seals of the state, and the flag of the Governor.

See also
[ Pennsylvania Coat of Arms (Flags of the World)]
Coats of arms of the U.S. states

References

External links 

Symbols of Pennsylvania
Pennsylvania
Pennsylvania
Pennsylvania
Pennsylvania
Pennsylvania
Pennsylvania
Pennsylvania
Pennsylvania